"Big Fun" is a 1982 song by the American band Kool & the Gang. It was originally released on their As One album.

"Big Fun" reached #14 on the UK charts and #21 in the US. The song peaked at number six on the US R&B chart in Billboard in late 1982.

Charts

See also
List of post-disco artists and songs

References

External links
 

1982 songs
1982 singles
Kool & the Gang songs
Songs written by James "J.T." Taylor
Songs written by Ronald Bell (musician)
Songs written by Robert "Kool" Bell
Songs written by Eumir Deodato
De-Lite Records singles
Post-disco songs
Songs written by Claydes Charles Smith